The 2008 Barnsley Metropolitan Borough Council election took place on 1 May 2008 to elect members of Barnsley Metropolitan Borough Council in South Yorkshire, England. One third of the council, alongside an additional vacancy in Old Town was up for election. Prior to the election the defending councillor in Penistone West, having earlier defected from Conservative to the Barnsley Independent Group, fought the election as an Independent. The Labour party stayed in overall control of the council.

Election result
Before the election it had been thought that the Labour party might lose overall control of the council but they held on by only one seat. They lost two seats to the Barnsley Independent Group but gained one seat from the Liberal Democrats to hold on. The Barnsley Independent Group also lost 1 seat to the Conservatives.  Overall turnout was 34.78%.

The losses for the Labour party were blamed on government policies, such as on immigration and the abolition of the 10p income tax band, by the leader of the council, Steve Houghton, who was himself re-elected for Cudworth ward.

This resulted in the following composition of the council:

Ward results

+/- figures represent changes from the last time these wards were contested.

By-elections between 2008 and 2010

References

2008 English local elections
2008
2000s in South Yorkshire